Chartainvilliers is a commune in the department of Eure-et-Loir and region of Centre-Val de Loire, north central France. It lies 12 km north-north-east of Chartres and some 70 km south-west of Paris.

Population

See also
Communes of the Eure-et-Loir department

References

Communes of Eure-et-Loir